Contaminated land contains substances in or under the land that are definitively or potentially hazardous to health or the environment. These areas often have a long history of industrial production and industrial farming. Many sites may be affected by their former uses such as mining, industry, chemical and oil spills and waste disposal. Areas that were previously industrial areas, called brownfield sites, are higher risk areas.

Contamination can also occur naturally as a result of the geology of the area, or through agricultural use.

Overview
Land can be contaminated by the following:

 heavy metals, such as arsenic, cadmium and lead
 oils and tars
 oil spills
 chemical substances and preparations, like solvents
 gases
 asbestos
 radioactive substances

United Kingdom

A requirement was placed on all local authorities in England, Wales and Scotland to investigate potentially contaminated sites and, where necessary, ensure they are remediated by Part IIA of the Environmental Protection Act 1990, which was inserted by the Environment Act 1995

The regime in Part IIA did not apply to radioactive contamination, but section 78YC permitted Ministers to make regulations to apply Part IIA to such contamination. Such Regulations have been made.

The Waste and Contaminated Land (Northern Ireland) Order 2007 made similar provision for Northern Ireland

Legal definition
Section 78A(2) of the Environmental Protection Act 1990 defines "Contaminated Land" as:

“Contaminated land” is any land which appears to the local authority in whose area it is situated to be in such a condition, by reason of substances in, on or under the land, that—
(a) significant harm is being caused or there is a significant possibility of such harm being caused; or
(b) significant pollution of controlled waters is being caused, or there is a significant possibility of such pollution being caused;

The Contaminated Land Report (CLR) series of documents have been produced by the Department for Environment, Food and Rural Affairs (DEFRA) and the Environment Agency, to provide regulators with "relevant, appropriate, authoritative and scientifically based information and advice on the assessment of risk from contamination in soils".

The Environment Agency has issued a number of Soil Guideline Values (SGVs) which, whilst non-binding, may be used as guidance in the environmental risk assessment of land and in setting remediation targets.  They should only be applied to human health assessments.

The Process

Assessment of contaminated land in the UK is predominantly undertaken under the planning system.  The National Planning Policy Framework (NPPF) sets out that, following development, a site should not be capable of being determined as ‘contaminated land’ under Part IIA of the Environmental Protection Act.  In addition, the risks from contamination should be assessed within the context of a site’s end-use and upon completion, the site should be ‘suitable’ for its new use.

A technical framework for identifying and dealing with land affected by contamination is detailed within DEFRA and Environment Agency guidance entitled Model Procedures for the Management of Land Contamination (CLR11). The process can broadly be divided into three stages: risk assessment, remedial options appraisal, and implementation of remediation.

Risk Assessment 
A 'phased approach' to risk assessment is encouraged within CLR11 and should typically include the following:
 Preliminary Risk Assessment – Also known as a Phase 1 Preliminary Risk Assessment, or Desk Study, this work involves the collection and review of many different sources of information including: local authority registers, environmental databases, geological maps, and historic records. A site walkover is usually also undertaken to identify any specific sources of contamination and to collect relevant photographs.  This information is compiled to produce a Conceptual Site Model (CSM).  There are three essential elements to the concept of risk in the context of land contamination, which combine to form a ‘contaminant linkage’. In order for a contaminant linkage to be active, a source, pathway, and receptor must all be present.
 Site Investigation – This work should meet the criteria set out in British Standard 10175 entitled Investigation of Potentially Contaminated Sites - Code of Practice.  It can typically involve completion of boreholes or trial pits and collection of soil or groundwater samples for submission to an appropriately accredited laboratory.
 Generic/Detailed Risk Assessment – This process involves assessment of contaminant concentrations in the context of the site’s proposed end use.  Assessment can be either generic (using predefined assessment criteria) or detailed (taking into account a number of site and receptor-specific factors).

Remedial Options Appraisal 
Should the risk assessment demonstrate that unacceptable risks to human health or the surrounding environment are likely to exist, then some remedial work will be necessary.  This process involves three key stages:
 Identification of Remedial Options – A short-list of feasible remediation options, capable of achieving the remedial targets should be drawn up.
 Remedial Options Appraisal – Each remedial option should be reviewed on its merits and drawbacks. Site-specific information should be considered along with the timescale and sustainability of each option.
 Development of Remedial Strategy – A remedial method statement should be produced, which sets out how the remedial work will be implemented.

Implementation of the Remedial Strategy 
Once the remedial strategy has been approved by relevant regulatory authorities then it should be implemented.  A verification report should be produced upon completion of the work to demonstrate that remedial targets have been achieved.  This work may include testing of remedial excavations, results of post-remedial monitoring, certification for imported material or membrane integrity testing, amongst other things.  Details of ongoing/long-term monitoring may also need to be agreed at this stage, possibly under a Section 106 Agreement.

Upon completion of this process, the site should not pose a significant risk to future users or the surrounding environment and should be suitable for its end use.  Once this process of site assessment has been completed successfully then any associated planning conditions can be discharged.

References

Pollution